Krasnodar (K-148) was a Russian Oscar II class submarine which was built at Sevmash under serial number 617, it was launched in March 1985 and decommissioned in late 2012. On March 17, 2014 a fire broke out on or near the vessel during its scrapping at the Nerpa Russian Naval Shipyard near the administratively closed city Snezhnogorsk. A spokesperson for the shipyard reported that the fire was quickly extinguished, without injuries or radioactive releases.

References

1985 ships
Oscar-class submarines
Ships built in Russia
Submarines of the Soviet Navy